Lake Joseph is located in Seguin Township, Ontario.  The lake is surrounded by many cottages.  Lake Joseph is connected to Lake Rosseau through the narrows at Port Sandfield and the Joseph River.

Lake Front Resident Advocacy Group
There are many community groups based on Lake Joseph.  The largest of these is the Muskoka Lakes Association (MLA).  The MLA was founded in 1894 to represent the interests of lakeshore residents on Lakes Rosseau, Joseph and Muskoka and many smaller surrounding lakes.

See also
List of lakes in Ontario
 Camp Ekon

References

External links
Township of Muskoka Lakes
Muskoka Lakes Association

Lakes of Parry Sound District
Lakes of the District Municipality of Muskoka